Belbina is a genus of planthoppers in the subfamily Enchophorinae (Fulgoridae): erected by Carl Stål in 1863; species can be found in Madagascar.

Species
The Catalogue of Life and FLOW list:
 Belbina bergrothi (Schmidt, 1911)
 Belbina blotei Lallemand, 1959
 Belbina bourgoini Constant, 2014
 Belbina falleni Stål, 1863 - type species
 Belbina foliaceae Lallemand, 1959
 Belbina laetitiae Constant, 2014
 Belbina lambertoni Lallemand, 1922
 Belbina madagascariensis (Westwood, 1851)
 Belbina minuta Lallemand, 1922
 Belbina pionneaui Lallemand, 1922
 Belbina recurva Lallemand, 1950
 Belbina servillei (Spinola, 1839)

References

External links

Insects of Madagascar
Auchenorrhyncha genera
Aphaeninae
Endemic fauna of Madagascar